, often referred to as Tokai Guitars, is a Japanese musical instrument manufacturer situated in Hamamatsu city, Shizuoka prefecture. Tokai is one of Japan's leading companies in the business. The company was founded in 1947 by Tadayouki Adachi and remains family-owned.

Although Tokai currently focuses on electric and acoustic guitars, basses and autoharps (called "chromaharp"), the company manufactured other instruments such as melodicas, pianos and guitar amplifiers in the past.

History 
Tokai began in 1947, as a harmonica and piano manufacturer. It developed its first melodica, the Pianica, in 1961. Tokai began making banjos and harpsichords in 1973 and the electric piano in 1975.

Tokai started making classical guitars in 1965. It made its first electric guitar in 1968 with the Humming Bird, a guitar loosely based on the Mosrite Mark I and II. This was followed in 1970 with the Humming Bird Custom acoustic guitar (not to be confused with the Hummingbird guitar model produced by Gibson).

From 1970 to 1973, Tokai produced the Conn line of acoustic guitars under contract with C.G. Conn. In 1972, Tokai entered into a joint-venture with C. F. Martin & Company to supply acoustic guitar parts and also to build Martin's Sigma electric guitars. In 1975, it launched its own Cat's Eyes line of acoustic guitars, which were replicas of C.F. Martin guitars.

Between 1977 and 1978, Tokai began making various Fender and Gibson replica electric guitars and basses. These models are generically known as "lawsuit guitars". Tokai's replica of the Gibson Les Paul electric guitar, named the "Les Paul Reborn" model, started in 1978. By 1980, the name was changed to "Reborn Old" and later to its current name, "Love Rock". The name change was in response to threats from American guitar companies to go to court to protect their copyrights. Tokai also made Fender replicas, the "Springy Sound" (ST series, Fender Stratocaster replica) and the "Breezy Sound" (TE series, Fender Telecaster replica).Both Stevie Ray Vaughan and Chuck Hammer played a "Tokai Springy Sound" at one time. This guitar was fitted with lipstick pickups and can be seen on the cover of his second studio album Couldn't Stand the Weather. By the late 1970s, replicas of Fender guitars, such as the ".38 Special" guitar and the "Hard Puncher" bass (replica of the Fender Precision Bass), began to be sold in Japan and Europe.

In 1982, Tokai introduced an aluminum-body guitar called the Talbo (Tokai Aluminum Body) which the band Devo played at one time. Tokai has its own instrument making factory and have built guitars for well-known brands under contract (OEM). Tokai briefly made Fender guitars for sale in Japan only during the transition from Fujigen to all Dyna production, this lasted a few brief months and then Dyna was eliminated as a source.

Characteristics 
The original selling price in Japanese yen is often included in the model number—for example TLS-100 = 100,000 Japanese yen. The higher priced Tokai Gibson replicas have nitrocellulose finishes and long tenon neck joints. Tokai guitars have been made in Japan, Korea and China. Korean production started around the mid-1990s. Tokai guitars made in Korea (MIK) are lower priced guitars, similar to the Korean Epiphone guitars. The MIK (Made in Korea) guitars can be differentiated by the truss rod cover. Japanese guitars have a two-screw truss rod cover whereas the Korean guitars have a three-screw truss rod cover (although some early Korean guitars also have two-screw truss rod covers). The MIK guitars usually have a different Nashville style bridge instead of the usual ABR-1 bridge. Furthermore, MIK Gibson replica guitars usually have a neck made from maple, and the body wood is usually made from either alder, agathis or nato.

Serial numbers 
Tokai uses a seven-digit serial number usually pressed into the back of the headstock for the Gibson model replicas. Love Rocks use the first digit of the serial number for the year, 10XXXXX=1981 and starting in 1989 Love Rocks use the first two digits for the year, 89XXXXX=1989. Reborn models use only the first digit for the year, 800XXXX = 1978.

There is a major exception to this in that some "Reborn Olds" (very rare) and "Love Rock" models have inked serial numbers on the reverse of the headstock (often referred to as "Inkies"). These guitars are, it is generally agreed, from 1980 (00xxxxx and 01xxxxx) and 1981 (11xxxxx) although there are those who would disagree with this.

It also appears that some of the original 1978 "Les Paul Reborns" have  serial numbers.

Some MIK Love Rock models have no serial number and simply have "Made In Korea" inked on the back of the headstock. Sometimes the model number may be located under the bridge pickup. MIK Love Rock models identified in this manner include ALS48 and ALS50Q.

The Tokai Fender replicas have a production number serial number that contains no year information.

References

External links 

 Official website

Companies based in Shizuoka Prefecture
Manufacturing companies established in 1947
Guitar manufacturing companies
Guitar amplifier manufacturers
Audio equipment manufacturers of Japan
1947 establishments in Japan
Musical instrument manufacturing companies of Japan
Japanese brands
Hamamatsu